The Cabinet of Jimmy Morales was the fiftieth cabinet of Guatemala.

The cabinet took office on 14 January 2016 and ended on 14 January 2020.

Composition

References

Politics of Guatemala
Government of Guatemala